Nalle Hukkataival (born 8 September 1986 in Helsinki) is a Finnish professional climber. He specializes in bouldering. He has to his credit many first ascents and repeats in the V15-V16 range. In 2014, he repeated Gioia (V15/16 or 8C/+). In October 2016, he completed the line on his Lappnor project giving it the name Burden of Dreams and proposing a boulder grade of V17 (9A).

Biography 

Nalle Hukkataival was 12 when he tried climbing for the first time at a local climbing wall. At age 17, Nalle took part in his first competition, the Nordic Championships. A year later, he took 5th place in the World Championships in Munich, making him the top ranked climber in the Nordic countries. The following year, after having just served six months in the military, Nalle won the Arco Rockmaster in Italy and a few months later became the Vice European Champion. He has since won several international competitions, including the 2010 IMS Cup and Tierra Boulder Battle, and he is a 4-time Nordic Champion and 8-time Finnish Champion in bouldering.

Nalle made the first ascent of the hardest boulder in Finland and its first 8B. He also opened the first 8B+ (V14) boulder in the Nordic countries, Living the Dream, and the hardest sport route in Finland. He has kept pushing the standards ever since and his hardest first ascent in Finland, Circus Elephant Syndrome, could well be the first 8C (V15) boulder in the Nordic countries.

He won Climbing Magazine's Golden Piton Award for his hard repeats and first ascent of Livin' Large, a V15/V16 highball in South Africa. He's also one of a handful of people in the world to flash 8B (V13) boulder.

See also
 Notable first free ascents

References

External links

 
 

 

1986 births
Living people
Finnish sportspeople
Finnish rock climbers
Sportspeople from Helsinki
Boulder climbers